José Antonio Romero (born April 16, 1968) is a Mexican sprint canoer who competed from the early 1990s to the early 2000s. He won a bronze medal in the C-4 1000 m event at the 1994 ICF Canoe Sprint World Championships in Mexico City.

Romero also competed in two Summer Olympics, earning his best finish of sixth in the C-2 1000 m event at Sydney in 2000.

References

Sports-reference.com profile

1968 births
Canoeists at the 1992 Summer Olympics
Canoeists at the 2000 Summer Olympics
Living people
Mexican male canoeists
Olympic canoeists of Mexico
ICF Canoe Sprint World Championships medalists in Canadian
Pan American Games medalists in canoeing
Pan American Games silver medalists for Mexico
Canoeists at the 1991 Pan American Games
Medalists at the 1991 Pan American Games
20th-century Mexican people